Lecithocera erebosa is a moth in the family Lecithoceridae. It was described by Chun-Sheng Wu and You-Qiao Liu in 1993. It is found in Beijing, China.

The wingspan is about 10 mm. The species resembles Lecithocera paraulias.

References

Moths described in 1993
erebosa
Moths of Asia